SS France was a Compagnie Générale Transatlantique (CGT, or French Line) ocean liner, constructed by the Chantiers de l'Atlantique shipyard at Saint-Nazaire, France, and put into service in February 1962.

France was later purchased by Norwegian Cruise Line (NCL) in 1979, renamed SS Norway and underwent significant modifications to refit her for cruising duties. She was renamed SS Blue Lady and sold to be scrapped in 2005, and scrapping was completed in late 2008.

Characteristics
France was the French Line flagship from 1961 to 1974, combining regular five days/nights transatlantic crossings with occasional winter cruises, as well as two world circumnavigations. During her last years, to save fuel costs, crossings took six days/nights.

Some, like ship historian John Maxtone-Graham, believe that France was purposely built to serve as both a liner and a cruise ship, stating: "Once again, the company had cruise conversion in mind... for cruises, all baffle doors segregating staircases from taboo decks were opened to permit free circulation throughout the vessel." However, others, such as ship historian William Miller, have asserted that France was the "last purposely designed year-round transatlantic supership."

History

Concept and construction
France was constructed to replace the line's other ageing ships like  and SS Liberté, which were outdated by the 1950s. Without these vessels the French Line had no ability to compete against their rivals, most notably the Cunard Line, which also had plans for constructing a new modern liner. (This ship would eventually be the 68,000-ton Queen Elizabeth 2.)

At first, the idea of two 35,000-ton running mates was considered to replace Ile de France and Liberté. The idea of such a publicly funded liner was controversial, leading to raucous debates in the French parliament. The dealing lasted three and a half years, and though the letter commissioning the construction was finally signed by the Chairman of the Compagnie Générale Transatlantique, Jean Marie, on 25 July 1956, debate about the form, cost and construction schedule for France lasted a further year.

Beyond the luxuries, the French Line had to also face the realities that transatlantic passenger trade was forecast to decline due to increased air travel. Also, costs to operate ships were increasing, mostly due to prices of crude oil.  Thus, the new ship would be larger than Ile, but smaller and cheaper to operate than Normandie. She would also only be a two-class liner, which would, like the recently built , be able to be converted from a segregated, class restricted crossing mode to a unified, classless cruising mode, thereby allowing the ship to be more versatile in its operations. Despite these requirements, she was still to be the longest ship ever built, as well as one of the fastest, meaning not only an advanced propulsion system, but also a hull design which would withstand the rigours of the North Atlantic at high speed.

Hull G19 was built by Chantiers de l'Atlantique shipyard, in Saint-Nazaire, France, her keel being laid down on 7 October 1957. She was built in a pioneering manner: rather than constructing a skeleton which was then covered in steel hull plating, large parts of the ship were prefabricated in other cities (such as Orléans, Le Havre and Lyon). The hull was fully welded, leading to weight savings, and two sets of stabilisers were fitted.

She was blessed by the Bishop of Nantes, Monseigneur Villepelet, and launched on 11 May 1960, at 4:15 pm, by Madame Yvonne de Gaulle, wife of the President, and was then named France, in honour both of the country, and of the two previous CGT ships to bear the name. By 4:22 pm France was afloat and under command of tugs. President De Gaulle was also in attendance at the launch, and gave a patriotic speech, announcing that France had been given a new Normandie, they were able to compete now with Cunard's Queens, and the Blue Riband was within their reach. In reality, however, the  speed of United States would prove impossible to beat.

After the launch, the propellers were installed (the entire process taking over three weeks), the distinctive funnels affixed to the upper decks, the superstructure completed, life boats placed in their davits, and the interiors fitted out. France then undertook her sea trials on 19 November 1961, and averaged an unexpected . With the French Line satisfied, the ship was handed over, and undertook a trial cruise to the Canary Islands with a full complement of passengers and crew. During this short trip she met, at sea, Liberté which was on her way to the shipbreakers.

Service history as France
France's maiden voyage to New York took place on 3 February 1962, with many of France's film stars and aristocracy aboard.

On 14 December 1962, France carried the Mona Lisa from Le Havre to New York, where the painting was to embark on an American tour.

She sailed the North Atlantic run between Le Havre and New York for thirteen years. By the beginning of the 1970s jet travel was by far more popular than ship travel, and the cost of fuel was ever increasing. France, which had always relied on subsidies from the French government, was forced to take advantage of these subsidies more and more.

Using the ship's versatile design to its full potential, the CGT began to send France on winter cruises, which was off-season for the Atlantic trade. One design flaw was revealed when the ship reached warmer waters: her two swimming pools, one each for first and tourist class, were both indoors; the first class pool deep within the ship's hull, and the tourist class pool on an upper deck, but covered with an immovable glass dome. The latter, perhaps, was the more aggravating in hot weather. She also had limited outdoor deck space, with much of what was available protected behind thick glass wind-screens, useful on the North Atlantic, but frustrating when blocking cooling breezes in the tropics.

Nonetheless, France's cruises were popular, and her first world cruise took place in 1972. Too large to traverse the Panama and Suez Canals, she was forced to sail around Cape Horn and the Cape of Good Hope. That same year, with the destruction of the Seawise University (former RMS Queen Elizabeth) by fire in Hong Kong, France became the largest in-service passenger ship in the world.

Still, as the opening years of the decade progressed, the cruise market expanded, seeing the construction of smaller, purpose-built cruise ships which could also fit through the Panama Canal. Worse, in 1973 the Oil Crisis hit, and the price of oil went from US$3 to $12 per barrel. When the French government, at the end of the Trente Glorieuses, realized that keeping France running would necessitate an additional ten million dollars a year, it opted instead to subsidize the then in-development Concorde. Without this government money, the French Line could not operate, and with a press release issued in 1974 it was announced that France would be withdrawn from service on 25 October that year.

At that, the crew decided to take matters into their own hands: an eastbound crossing on 6 September, her 202nd crossing, was delayed several hours while the crew met to decide whether to strike then and there, in New York, or six days later outside Le Havre.  Le Havre won, and the ship was commandeered by a group of French trade unionists who anchored France in the entrance to the port, thereby blocking all incoming and outgoing traffic. The 1200 passengers aboard had to be ferried to shore on tenders, while approximately 800 of the crew remained aboard.

The strikers demanded that the ship be allowed to continue to serve, along with a 35% wage increase for themselves. Their mission failed, and the night of the takeover proved to be the ship's last day of service for the CGT. It took over a month for the stand-off to end, and by 7 December 1974, the ship was moored at a distant quay in Le Havre, known colloquially as quai de l'oubli – the pier of the forgotten.

By that time France had completed 377 crossings and 93 cruises (including two world cruises), carried a total of 588,024 passengers on trans-Atlantic crossings, and 113,862 passengers on cruises, and had sailed a total of 1,860,000 nautical miles.

First decommissioning

The mothballing of France was met with dismay by much of the French population, resulting in a song by Michel Sardou, titled "Le France".

The ship sat in the same spot for approximately four years, with the interiors, including all furniture, still completely intact. There were no plans to scrap the ship, or to sell it. In 1977 Saudi Arabian millionaire Akram Ojjeh expressed an interest in purchasing the vessel for use as a floating museum for antique French furniture and artworks, as well as a casino and hotel off the coast of the south-east United States. Though he purchased the ship for $24 million, this proposal was never realised, and others were rumoured to have floated, including bids from the Soviet Union to use her as a hotel ship in the Black Sea, and a proposal from China to turn her into a floating industrial trade fair.

In the end, the ship was sold in 1979 to Knut Kloster, the owner of Norwegian Caribbean Line for $18 million for conversion into the world's largest cruise ship. Just before France was renamed Norway one last marriage was performed aboard the ship at the quay in Le Havre. The wedding was performed by Reverend Agnar Holme, the Norwegian Seaman's chaplain. Greg Tighe, Director of Research and Corporate Development for NCL, was married to Lorraine Anne Evering in France's chapel. Witnesses included the ship's Captain, and several members of NCL's management team. This marked the last marriage to be performed aboard France, which had hosted hundreds of weddings over her transatlantic career.

By August of that year Norway was moved to the Lloyd shipyards in Bremerhaven, Germany, where she would undergo renovations to the cost of $80 million.

Service history as Norway

Norway was registered in Oslo, given the call sign LITA (literally meaning "small"), and was re-christened on 14 April 1980. She was the first (and only) purpose-built transatlantic ocean liner that was remodeled to be employed exclusively in luxury cruise service. Her hull form, bow design, and accommodation layout had been designed specifically for the rigors of crossing the North Atlantic, year-round. In her remodeling for cruise service, she was given a more generous accommodation, as well as larger and more numerous public spaces for the cruise-type recreations. Mechanically, the four screw propulsion plant was reduced to two screws. And in a bid for economy, she was given a complete set of bow/stern thrusters to give her the flexibility she needed to bring her into harbour and to dock without resorting to the expensive pilot and tugboat operations that were standard procedure in the heyday of the transatlantic express liners. When her re-fit was completed, and on her maiden call to Oslo, Senior Steward Wesley Samuels of Jamaica, in the presence of King Olav V, hoisted the United Nations flag as a sign of the ship's international crew.

She began her maiden voyage to Miami that same year, amidst speculation about her future in the cruise industry. France had been built as an ocean liner: for speed; long, narrow, with a deep draft, as well as an array of cabin shapes and sizes designed in a compact manner more for purpose travel than languid cruising. But Norway proved popular, and made the notion of the ship being a destination in itself credible. Her size, passenger capacity, and amenities revolutionized the cruise industry and started a building frenzy as competitors began to order larger ships.

As cruise competition attempted to take some of Norway's brisk business, Norway herself was upgraded several times in order to maintain her position as the "grande dame" of the Caribbean. In September and October 1990, there was the addition of two decks atop her superstructure, adding 135 new suites and luxury cabins. While many ship aficionados believe the new decks spoiled her original clean, classic lines, the new private veranda cabins on the added decks were instrumental in keeping Norway financially afloat during the later years of her operation, as these became a common feature throughout the cruise industry. She received additional refits in 1993 and 1996 in order to comply with the new SOLAS (Safety of Life at Sea) regulations.

Competition eventually overtook Norway, and she even started taking a back seat to other, newly built ships in NCL's lineup itself. No longer the "Ship amongst Ships", NCL severely cut back on her maintenance and upkeep. She experienced several mechanical breakdowns, fires, incidents of illegal waste dumping, and safety violations for which she was detained at port pending repairs. Despite the cutbacks, the ship remained extremely popular among cruise enthusiasts, some of whom questioned the owner's actions in light of the continuing successful operation of Queen Elizabeth 2, which had become a well-maintained rival still operating 5-star luxury cruises and transatlantic crossings for Cunard. In spite of this, the cutbacks continued and problems mounted even as the ship continued to sail with full occupancy. A turbocharger fire erupted on Norway as she entered Barcelona in 1999, which pulled her out of service for three weeks. During one of the following cruises to Norway she broke down in Bergen with leaks to one of the propeller seals delaying sailing until repaired.

Slated for retirement, Norway sailed out of Manhattan's west side piers for the last time on 5 September 2001, on yet another transatlantic crossing to Greenock, Scotland, and then on to her home port of Le Havre, France. Her passengers would learn of the terrorist attacks on New York and Washington six days later, while in mid-ocean.  As the cruise industry reeled from the aftermath of the terrorist attacks, her owners decided to place her back into service – operating bargain-basement cruises from Miami, after a brief cosmetic refit that failed to address her mounting mechanical and infrastructure problems.

On 25 May 2003, after docking in Miami at 5:00 a.m., Norway was seriously damaged by a boiler explosion at 6:37 a.m. that killed eight crew members and injured seventeen as superheated steam flooded the boiler room and blasted into crew quarters above through ruptured decking. None of the passengers were injured. The National Transportation Safety Board determined that "the probable cause of the boiler rupture on the Norway was the deficient boiler operation, maintenance, and inspection practices". On 27 June 2003, NCL/Star decided to relocate Norway, and she departed Miami under tow, although at first NCL/Star refused to announce her destination. She headed towards Europe and eventually arrived in Bremerhaven on 23 September 2003. NCL announced that constructing a new boiler was not possible but boiler parts were available to make the needed repairs. In Bremerhaven she was used as accommodation for NCL crew training to take their places on board the line's new Pride of America.

Former itineraries as Norway
NCL originally planned for Norway to sail empty from Germany to Miami, but a pre-inaugural cruise was added, with only a select number of passengers allowed to sail. Starting from Oslo, Norway, stopping at Southampton, England, and ending in New York City. A 6-day cruise to Bermuda was planned but cancelled at the last minute in favor of fixing some problems. She set sail on her first inaugural cruise from Miami, Florida, on 1 June 1980, a 7-day cruise with only two stops, one in Little San Salvador then followed by a stop in St. Thomas, USVI. The other days of the cruise were sea days as Norway was the destination itself. This remained her main itinerary from 1980 to 1982 until NCL announced Nassau, Bahamas was added. By 1985 St. Maarten, Netherlands Antilles was added. In 1987 her new itinerary was introduced: a 7-day cruise from Miami stopping at St. Maarten, St. John, USVI; St. Thomas and Great Stirrup Cay. Her Western Caribbean cruises later introduced were 7-days stopping at Cozumel, Mexico; Grand Cayman, Cayman Islands; Roatan and NCL's private island Great Stirrup Cay. Between regular cruising in the Caribbean and dry dock periods, she sailed many cruises to Western Mediterranean, Western Europe coast, Northern Europe, the British Isles and the Norwegian fjords.

Her official farewell cruise was a 17-day transatlantic cruise from Miami stopping at New York; Halifax, Nova Scotia; St John's, Newfoundland and Labrador; Greenock, Scotland; Le Havre, France and ending in Southampton. But a decision was made to keep Norway sailing bargain-based Caribbean cruises out of Miami. This continued until her demise in May 2003.

Second decommissioning

"The Norway will never sail again," it was announced on 23 March 2004, by NCL Chief Executive Colin Veitch. The ship's ownership was transferred to NCL's parent company, Star Cruises.

Due to large amounts of asbestos aboard the ship (mostly in machine and bulkhead areas), Norway was not allowed to leave Germany for any scrap yards due to the Basel Convention. After assuring the German authorities that Norway would go to Asia for repairs and further operation in Australia, she was allowed to leave port under tow. It was reported that the art from her two dining rooms, children's playroom, stairtower, and library were removed and placed in storage, to possibly be utilized on board a revitalized , or another ship in the NCL fleet. Later photos of Norway at the scrapyards of Alang, India, would prove this statement to be untrue. Norway left Bremerhaven under tow on 23 May 2005, and reached Port Klang, Malaysia on 10 August 2005.

In fact, the ship was sold to an American naval demolition dealer for scrap value in December 2005. After eventually reselling the ship to a scrap yard, the ship was to be towed to India for demolition. In light of protests from Greenpeace, potentially lengthy legal battles due to environmental concerns over the ship's breakup, and amidst charges of fraudulent declarations made by the company to obtain permission to leave Bremerhaven, her owners cancelled the sale contract, refunded the purchase price, and left the ship where she was.

Blue Lady
Norway was sold in April 2006 to Bridgend Shipping Limited of Monrovia, Liberia, and renamed Blue Lady in preparation for scrapping. One month later she was again sold, to Haryana Ship Demolition Pvt. Ltd., and was subsequently left anchored in waters off the Malaysian coast after the government of Bangladesh refused Blue Lady entry into their waters due to the onboard asbestos. Three weeks later, the ship began its journey towards Indian waters, though it was announced that she had left Malaysian waters for the United Arab Emirates for repairs and to take on new crew and supplies.

Upon learning of the ship's destination, Gopal Krishna, an environmentalist and an anti-asbestos activist, filed an application before the Supreme Court of India to ensure that the ship, reportedly containing asbestos, complied with the Court's 14 October 2003 order which sought prior decontamination of ships in the country of export before they could be allowed entry into Indian waters. On 17 May 2006, Kalraj Mishra expressed his concern to the Indian Parliament over possible hazards Blue Lady presented, and requested that the government put a halt to the ship's entry. As the Indian Supreme Court had lifted any ban on the ship's entry, Blue Lady was anchored 100 km off the Indian coast in mid-July, coming from Fujairah, UAE.

This also cleared the way for her scrapping at Alang, in Gujarat, pending an inspection of the on-board asbestos by experts from the Gujarat Pollution Control Board (GPCB).
After GPCB chairman, K.Z. Bhanujan, said the Board had constituted an experts' committee for inspection, Blue Lady was docked in Pipavav, Amreli district. On 2 August 2006, after a five-day inspection, the experts declared the ship safe for beaching and dismantling in Alang. This prompted a fury of controversy over the legality of such an act, including a press release from the NGO Platform on Shipbreaking that critiqued the technical report, alleging that the Technical Committee was under undue pressure to allow the ship to be beached, and had failed to follow the Basel Convention and the Supreme Court of India's order that ships must be decontaminated of hazardous substances such as PCBs and asbestos, and, in any case, must be fully inventoried and formally notified prior to arrival in the importing country. No such notification was made by either Malaysia (last country of departure) nor Germany (country where the ship became waste).

The NGO Platform on Shipbreaking also announced that it was prepared to launch a global campaign against Star Cruises and their subsidiary Norwegian Cruise Lines for corporate negligence in this case.

Photos from Alang revealed that Blue Lady was still partially afloat off the coast; her bow on dry beach at low tide, and the ship fully afloat at high tide. The photos also showed that neither NCL nor Star Cruises had removed any of the ship's onboard furniture or artworks (including the murals in the Windward Dining Room and Children's Playroom, and the Steinway piano in Le Bistro), as had previously been reported.

Fans of France became concerned about the future of the art pieces, both due to the ship lying at anchor in a very humid environment without power for air conditioning, and due to lack of concern for preservation on the part of the scrappers. Still, it was stated that as of early September 2006, the ship's owner had signed contracts with various buyers, including auctioneers and a French museum, to sell the artworks. Other fittings were to be sold by the ton.

Gopal Krishna again moved an application seeking compliance with the Basel Convention, and three days later the Indian Supreme Court decided that the scrapping was to be postponed, stipulating that the Technical Committee, which earlier approved the scrapping, were to write a new report to be submitted before the Court's final decision. That decision was reached on 11 September 2007 (the 33rd anniversary of France's last day on the Atlantic), when the court ruled that Blue Lady was safe to scrap, a decision that was received negatively by environmentalists.

By 4 December of the same year, it was confirmed that the tip of Blue Lady's bow had been cut; a ceremonial move done to most ships that end up in Alang just prior to the full-scale breaking of a ship. It was confirmed on 20 January that Blue Lady had commenced scrapping. Scrapping began on the forward part of the sun deck. The suites added during the 1990 refit were gone by March, briefly returning the ship to her pre-1990 profile.

By 12 July 2008 the bow and the stern of the ship had been removed, with little of the ship's famous profile still recognizable. By September 2008, most of what remained above the waterline had been cut away, and the ship's demolition was essentially completed by late 2008.

In 2009 the tip of the bow of Blue Lady was returned to the country of her birth as one of a catalogue of auction pieces removed from the ship before scrapping commenced. The auction was held on 8 and 9 February. It is now on public display at Paris Yacht Marina, Port de Grenelle, Paris 15e.

In January 2010 one of the two sets of neon letters which sat atop the superstructure of France before her conversion was restored and put on display. The letters, which spell "France", were displayed at the Musée national de la Marine in Paris. After this they were returned to Le Havre and presented to the Musée Malraux, and now face the front of the harbor.

Design

Exterior

France

When France was commissioned in 1956 the French Line asked for a ship which was to be the longest ever built, as well as one of the fastest. But beyond the technicalities, the ship was also to be an ocean-going symbol of France and thus had to be artfully designed. Also similar to Normandie, France was equipped with a whaleback on her bow.

Deckhouses on France's superstructure were built of aluminium, to reduce the ship's weight and thereby conserve fuel in operation. Within the superstructure a full-length outdoor promenade deck was designed into both sides of the Pont Canots. Unlike on many other ships, this deck did not wrap completely around the ship, being blocked at the forward end by cabins built in behind the bridgescreen.

One of Frances most distinguishable features were her funnels, designed not only to be eye-catching but functional as well. They were constructed with two wings on the sides, each to lead the exhaust fumes outwards into the ship's slipstream, where they would be caught by the wind and carried away from the passenger decks below. In addition, each stack had a device that filtered solids from the outlet, returned it into the depths of the ship and then disposed of it into the ocean.

Despite the modern appearance of France, she was painted in the traditional CGT colours, used since the 19th century, of a black hull with red boot-topping and white superstructure, and funnels in red with black cap-bands.

The ship's exterior remained unchanged during her thirteen years of service.

Norway

In the conversion of France into a ship used for cruising, many alterations were made to her exterior decks.

Most notably, vast areas of deck space were opened up, and extended at the stern. A large lido deck was created at the very aft, built so wide, to accommodate as many sunbathing passengers as possible, that it cantilevered over the hull below, which narrowed in towards the stern at that point. The terrace off the First Class Smoking Room was lost in the construction of an outdoor buffet restaurant, and the Patio Provençal on the Sun Deck was filled in with a top-side swimming pool. This last addition created an odd space on Norway, where a tunnel-like space remained around the tank of the pool, into which the original exterior windows and doors of the surrounding cabins, which once looked into the Patio Provençal, still opened, all in their original 1960s colours.

On the forecastle, behind the whaleback, the two cargo kingposts were removed and giant davits were installed to hoist two two-deck, 11-knot tenders, built by Holen Mekaniske Verksted in Norway, and used to transfer passengers between Norway and island docks where the harbour would not allow for the ship's 9-meter (35 ft) draft. Based on a World War II landing craft design, these tenders were named Little Norway I and Little Norway II, and were each themselves registered as ships, making Norway the only passenger ship in the world to carry ships. The two tenders were removed after the ship's retirement and moved to Norwegian's private island at Great Stirrup Cay in the Bahamas. Both vessels are still in service.

Below the waterline, the forward engine room was dismantled and the two outboard propellers were removed to reduce fuel consumption as a high service speed was no longer required as she was now a cruise ship.

Her operation was revived three further times, in 1990, 1997, and 2001, after machinery, decks, and recreational facilities were renovated. During her 1990 refit, two further decks were added to the top of her structure that featured luxury suites with private verandas. This addition raised her overall tonnage to 76,049 (reclaiming the title of largest passenger ship in the world, from the 73,000-ton Sovereign of the Seas), her passenger capacity to 2,565, and gave her a competitive edge against newer ships being built at that time which featured more and more private balcony suites for their passengers. The addition of the decks was criticised by ship fans for making Norway appear top-heavy.

Interior

France
France's interiors were where the ship displayed its purpose as a showcase of modern French art and design. However, the interior designers were burdened with the pressure of living up to France's last great Ship of State, Normandie, whose interiors had been on a scale never surpassed either before or since her construction. On top of this they had to work within the more strict fire regulations laid down after the end of World War II, which gave them a limited palette consisting of few woods and much aluminium, Formica, and plastic veneers. Also, fire regulations would not allow France to have the grand vistas that were constructed through Normandie's main First Class rooms. France's only double-height spaces were the theatre, First Class smoking room, and both first and tourist Class dining rooms.

One area given an unusual amount of attention was the ship's kitchens; 1,500 square meters in area, and placed almost amidships, between the two dining rooms which the one kitchen served. It was thought by the CGT directors that France would not only display the best in French art and design, but also French cuisine. The kitchens were equipped with the most advanced machinery available, as well as many traditional cooking aides, including a stove that was 12 meters long and 2.5 meters wide. Staffed with 180 of France's best cooks, sauce and pastry chefs, rotisserie cooks, head waiters and wine stewards, this team made France one of the finest restaurants in the world, and the food on board prompted food critic Craig Claiborne to state France's Grille Room was the "best French restaurant in the world."

France's dog kennels were located on the Sun Deck, and, as they served both European and American dogs, the run was installed with both a Parisian milestone and a New York City fire hydrant.

For First Class passengers, the Pont Veranda (Veranda Deck) held most of the public rooms. These included the Library and Reading Room, Smoking Room, Grand Salon, and balcony of the theatre, which was dedicated to First Class passengers only. These rooms were arranged down the centre of the ship, with large, glass-enclosed promenades to either side. The Library was a circular room with glass and lacquered aluminum enclosed book-cases all around, holding 2,200 editions, and was overseen by an attendant who regulated the borrowing and returning of books, as well as assisting passengers with their choices. The Grand Salon had a raised ceiling in the centre, over the abstract grey and white marble mosaic dance floor, with lower more intimate spaces at the corners. The theatre, which functioned both as a Proscenium (live theatre) and cinema, sat 185 in the balcony, and 479 on the orchestra level, and had a projection booth which could handle 16, 35, and 70 mm film. Until the 1990s it was the largest theatre ever constructed on a ship. However, one of the main showpieces of the First Class salons was the Smoking Room at the very aft of the Pont Veranda. It had a raised section in the centre flanked by columns and double-height windows to port and starboard.

One level down was Pont Promenade, the main Tourist Class deck. The main lounges and rooms here were the Library, Smoking Room, Grand Salon, and orchestra level of the theatre. Like the Pont Veranda, Pont Promenade also had a glass-enclosed promenade along the port and starboard sides of the ship, though the windows did not run full height, nor were the spaces as long.

Pont A held both First Class and Tourist Class dining rooms. These rooms served as the gastronomic counterparts to the smoking rooms, in terms of importance, and thus of form and décor. The First Class Dining Room was located amidships, and spanned the full width of the ship, accommodating 400 passengers. The centre of the space rose to a circular dome, some 5.5 m (18 ft) high and, as on  Normandie, passengers entered from one deck up (Pont Principale) and descended a grand, central staircase to the main dining room floor. Glassware, of which there was 4,800 wine and water glasses, was provided by Saint-Louis crystal factory, and tableware consisted of 22,000 china items, with 25,500 pieces of silverware. The Tourist Class Dining Room similarly was two decks high, but differed in that it had dining on the upper level, with only a well between the two floors, and no connecting staircase. It was placed aft of the kitchens, and sat 826 people. Next to the upper level of this dining room was the Children's Dining Room, which allowed both First and Second class parents to dine without the "inconvenience" of young children.

After the first few of France's cruises, CGT executives realised that there was a problem regarding the naming of the public rooms. After her entrance into service, the rooms were simply known as the "First Class Grand Salon," "First Class Dining Room," "Tourist Class Library," etc. However, during a cruise, where class barriers were withdrawn and all passengers were allowed to use all the spaces equally, it became a slight embarrassment for a passenger travelling in a large cabin to ask a steward for directions to the Tourist Class Dining Room. Hence, proper names were applied to each room to avoid the issue:

 First Class Salon – Salon Fontainebleau
 First Class Music Room – Salon Debussy
 First Class Card Room – Salon Monaco
 First Class Smoking Room – Salon Riviera
 First Class Dining Room – Salle à Manger Chambord
 Tourist Class Salon – Salon Saint Tropez
 Tourist Class Music Room – Salon Ravel
 Tourist Class Smoking Room – Cafe Rive Gauche
 Tourist Class Dining Room – Salle à Manger Versailles

Some anomalies that contravened the class lines were Bar de l'Atlantique, essentially an after-hours club for drinking and dancing late into the night which was open to both First and Tourist Class passengers, the Tourist children's playroom, and the chapel, also open to both classes, all of which were located on First Class Pont Veranda.

Art
The décor of the rooms was regarded itself as art, with many notable French designers and artists commissioned to create the most striking spaces at sea. Beyond this, many pieces of artwork were especially ordered to adorn the walls of the dining rooms, lounges and cabins. Within the Salon Riviera the tapestry by Jean Picart le Doux dominated the entire forward wall, at 17.4 m (57 ft) long. In the same room two paintings by Roger Chapelain-Midy occupied niches in opposite corners to the aft. The overall interior was designed by André Arbus, who had previously worked with Chapelain-Midy to design sets for a performance of Les Indes galantes at the Palais Garnier in 1952. Slightly forward, the Salon Fontainebleau was decorated by Maxime Old, and within was contained three tapestries by Lucien Coutaud (Les femmes fleurs), two by Claude Idoux (Jardin magique, Fée Mirabelle) and Camille Hilaire (Sous-bois, Forêt de France). Near to that room was the Salon Debussy (Music Room) with three bronze lacquered panels by Pierre Bobot, and a bronze abstract sculpture of a young woman playing a flute, by Hubert Yencesse. The theatre's interior was done in red, grey and gold by Peynet, with the ceiling in grey mosaic tile, and the port and starboard walls in vertical gold lacquered aluminium panels, tilted outwards to allow for recessed lighting from behind. The chapel's interior was created by Anne Carlu Subes (daughter of Jacques Carlu) in silver anodized aluminium panels arranged in a 45-degree grid pattern. Jacques Noël created trompe-l'œil panels for all four walls of the First Class Children's Playroom in a Renaissance theme, and Jean A. Mercier painted a full mural entitled Une nouvelle arche de Noé (A New Noah's Arc) for the Tourist Class Children's Playroom, using an abstract rendition of France as the Arc. The Bar de l'Atlantique contained two ceramics by Pablo Picasso, as well three other ceramic sculptures (Faune cavalier, Portrait de Jacqueline and Joueur de flûte et danseuse) by the artist in the Salon Saint-Tropez.

Lower down the dining rooms were fitted out with the intention that the rooms would be visual equivalents of the excellent food served within them. The Chambord dining room was decorated by Mrs. Darbois-Gaudin in gold anodized aluminium, with monochrome chairs in red, orange and cream. The dome, painted black, contained an array of recessed spot-lights, and sat within a circular band of translucent, fluorescent-lit panels, all on a truncated rotunda of gold aluminium. Around all four walls of the room Jean Mandaroux's continuous mural, painted on 17 lacquered aluminium sheets, was entitled Les plaisirs de la vie: The Pleasures of Life. Less sumptuous in design, the Versailles dining room was done by Marc Simon in tones of green, white and grey. The walls were produced from Polyrey and Formica with a decoupaged gold leaf abstract pattern. Only the forward wall held a mural done in 14 engraved glass panels by Max Ingrand, as well as two tapestries, Les amoureux du printemps by Marc Saint-Saëns, and Paysage provençal by Auvigné. Lowest in the ship, the walls of the First Class swimming pool were covered with back-lit engraved glass panels by Max Ingrand, and a ceramic sculptural fountain by Jean Mayodon sat at the forward end of the room.

The First Class cabins also showcased design and art, especially in the Appartements de Grand Luxe. There were two aboard France, amidships, on the port and starboard sides, on Pont Supérieur. Each had a salon, dining room, two bedrooms, and three bathrooms. The Appartement de Grand Luxe Île de France held a painting, La place de la Concorde, by Bernard Lamotte, as well as one, Parc de Versailles, by Jean Carzou, who also designed the suite's main salon. Slightly less expensive were the Appartements de Luxe, of which there were 12, as the Appartement de Luxe Flandres with a painting of Jean Dries. Each of these was decorated by artists, including the bathrooms where mosaic artwork adorned the walls around tubs and showers. Some of the mosaics were by the sculptor Jacques Zwobada.

Norway
After the ship was purchased by Kloster in 1979 many of the original 1960s interiors were lost as rooms were either demolished within larger renovations, or redecorated to suit Caribbean cruising, under the direction of maritime architect Tage Wandborg and New York interior designer Angelo Donghia. Areas that were completely remodelled included all of the Tourist Class public rooms, and their indoor promenade areas were filled with prefabricated "junior suite" cabins. The former Versailles dining room, now the Leeward, saw the least remodelling, the wall finish and etched glass mural remaining; however, carpeting and furniture was replaced, the open well was lined with smoked glass and aluminium handrails, an aluminium chandelier was placed over the two-storey space, and a spiral staircase was installed to connect the two levels. The former Salon Saint Tropez became Norway's North Cape Lounge for cabaret and other shows; the décor more dark and muted. Further forward on the same deck, the old Café Rive Gauche was transformed into the ship's Monte Carlo casino. With the promenade windows now within cabins, no daylight penetrated to the casino, and so all windows were filled in. The Tourist Class swimming pool, its glass dome gone after the construction of the open pool deck above, was filled with neon lights and covered with a glass dance floor as part of the remodelling of the entire space into the ship's Dazzles disco.

However, most First Class rooms were left intact, save for the Salon Riviera and Salon Fontainebleau. The former was transformed into the Club International (dubbed Club-I by Norway aficionados), where every element of the original décor was removed. The square columns were made round with vertical aluminium fluting, the walls were repainted in a cream with baby-blue in the ceiling and wall niches, and all the original artwork and furniture was removed. In the corner niches oversized, crystal encrusted Neptune statues were placed, and similar crystal garlanded busts sat on brackets on the forward bulkhead. Lounge seating, sofas and rattan chairs were placed amongst potted ferns, giving the room an overall Miami art-deco feel. Only the railings and bronze, star-shaped light fixtures were original to the room. The latter space was gutted and remade into Checkers Cabaret; a small show lounge with abstract chrome palm trees around the columns, red lacquered wall panels, and a black-and-white checker board dance floor, again evoking a 1920s jazz club. The First Class Library remained untouched, and still used for the same purpose, while the Salon Debussy was turned into a shop, though its bronze décor and distinctive ceiling remained intact. To either side of these rooms ran the original First Class promenade decks, which were now turned into main circulation halls along the ship's principal public deck; the starboard dubbed Fifth Avenue and the port as Champs-Élysées, complete with columnar advertising posts similar to those found in Paris.

Main propulsion
France was constructed by the CGT with speed and comfort in mind, and used the most advanced technology of the time in the design of the ship's propulsion system and other power generating machinery. Fuel costs were also an added factor.

The machinery turning the four propellers was divided into two fore and aft groups, as was the electrical generating station.

When France was converted into Norway, the speed for trans-Atlantic crossing was no longer needed, and so the forward boilers and engines were shut down and eventually dismantled. This move also reduced the fuel consumption to 250 tonnes per 24 hours. The remaining four boilers and engine room were made fully automated, and operated from either a central control station below decks, or from the bridge. Five bow and stern thrusters, developing 10,600 hp, were also installed to increase manoeuvrability in ports without the assistance of tugs.

Media appearances

The Ric Hochet comic album Rapt sur le France published in 1968, the story takes place on France. The front of the comic shows a ship named France, with the distinctive funnels visible.

France, as one of the last transatlantic ocean liners before the jet age, was also treated as the connection between, for example, New York and France. This was shown well in Le Gendarme à New York where the main characters sail on France. The film also shows some of the 60s' interior of the ship. At the conclusion of the 1973 film Serpico, the title character can be seen sitting on the dock with the vessel behind him, as he prepares to sail on her into exile after testifying against the New York Police Department. During the opening of Dog Day Afternoon, also directed by Sidney Lumet, there is a shot of France docked in New York during the opening montage.

France was the ship that Elton John crossed the Atlantic Ocean in September 1974, and wrote the music to Bernie Taupin's lyrics for the Captain Fantastic And the Brown Dirt Cowboy album, on the ships piano.

France appears in the Kolchak: The Night Stalker episode "The Werewolf" as the cruise ship (on which the story takes place) at sea.

In 1983, Anne Murray and guests, Richard Simmons, Eddie Rabbitt, and Luis Rodriguez performed musical numbers while aboard the Norway for a TV show called Caribbean Cruise.

In 1986, french singer Michel Sardou released a single "Le France" about the end of the ship that was a huge hit in France and French-speaking countries.

In 1986, the American TV show, Today spent a week-long cruise aboard Norway.

Norway appears in the 1989 María Sorté/Enrique Novi Mexican telenovela Mi Segunda Madre from episode 18 as the cruise ship (on which the romantic story takes place) at PortMiami and at sea.

Norway appears during the closing credits of the 1994 Sylvester Stallone/Sharon Stone feature The Specialist in a flyover of the Port of Miami.

In 1994, the Norway, was featured in the children's show Real Wheels in the episode There Goes A Boat.

On 30 July 1998, at the request of a passenger, the pilots of Proteus Airlines Flight 706 made a slight detour from their intended route from Lyon to Lorient in Brittany, to see Norway that was anchored in nearby Quiberon Bay.  While circling the ship at a low altitude to give passengers a birds-eye view of the iconic former French vessel, the twin-engined Beechcraft 1900D was hit by a Cessna 177, causing both to crash into the bay and killing all 15 people aboard both aircraft. The event was chronicled in the Canadian TV series, Mayday season 16, episode 5: "Deadly Detour".

In The Simpsons season 25 episode 12 "Diggs" originally broadcast on 9 March 2014, the episode's Couch Gag featured an animation by Sylvain Chomet. A picture of France replaced the picture of the boat.

France was also seen in the 2015 animated feature Minions. As the Minions leave the water in New York City in 1968, the France is seen in the background.

See also

Pierre-Marie Poisson

Notes

Bibliography

External links
 The Classic Liners of Long Ago: France
 The liner France in French Lines Archives
 Compagnie Générale Transatlantique
 S/S Norway Preservation Foundation
 The Great Ocean Liners: France

Image galleries

 Norway Farewell Transatlantic 2001; many photos of Norway, including interiors and details of artwork
 Slide show of SS France/Norway images
 Webpage Pictures galleries and personal stories from SS France and SS Norway
 SS France pictures from the official French Line Archives (French captions)
 SS France: The tour page
 3-D virtual still photo and movie renderings of SS France

Ocean liners
Ships of the Compagnie Générale Transatlantique
Ships of Norwegian Cruise Line
Passenger ships of France
Passenger ships of Norway
1960 ships
Explosions in 2003
Maritime boiler explosions
Ships built by Chantiers de l'Atlantique